Dimitar Mitov (born 22 January 1997) is a Bulgarian professional footballer who plays as a goalkeeper for  club Cambridge United.

Club career

Early career in Bulgaria 
Born in Montana, Mitov spent part of his childhood in Kozloduy, where he began training football at the age of nine. Initially, he was deployed as an outfield player. After a short stint with Dunav Selanovtsi, in 2009, at age 12, he had a successful tryout with Hristo Stoichkov's academy and joined the ranks of Chavdar Etropole.

Charlton Athletic 
Mitov joined Charlton Athletic in 2013 from Bulgarian club Chavdar Etropole, after undergoing a trial at Nottingham Forest. In April 2015, he scored a goal from his own six-yard box against Coventry City U18's, gaining press attention. He featured for the club at under-18, under-21 and under-23 level but did not make a senior appearance for the club.

Canvey Island (loan) 
In February 2015, Mitov joined Isthmian League Premier Division club Canvey Island on a one-month loan. He made a single appearance in a 1–1 draw with Lewes on 28 February.

Cambridge United 
Following his release from Charlton Athletic, Mitov joined League Two club Cambridge United on a two-year contract.

On 8 August 2017, he made his debut in a 4–1 EFL Cup defeat to Bristol Rovers. Mitov's first league appearances for Cambridge came in the final 3 games of the 2017–18 season, playing against Morecambe, Newport County and Port Vale. 

On 16 May 2018, he extended his contract with Cambridge United. The contract kept him at the club until 2021 and was subsequently extended.

During the 2018–19 season, Mitov replaced David Forde as the first choice goalkeeper. Mitov made 21 league appearances in total over the season. Forde was then released at the end of the season, after falling down the pecking order.

He put in a remarkable performance in his team's 1–0 FA Cup victory over Newcastle United on 8 January 2022. On 30 April 2022, Mitov was named the Cambridge Player of the Season.

International career 
Mitov has represented Bulgaria at every age level from under-16 to under-19. He also captained his nation at under-17 and under-19 level.

Career statistics

Honours
Individual
Cambridge United Player of the Year: 2021–22

References

External links 

1997 births
Living people

Association football goalkeepers
Bulgarian footballers
People from Vratsa Province
Charlton Athletic F.C. players
Canvey Island F.C. players
Cambridge United F.C. players
English Football League players
Bulgaria youth international footballers
Bulgaria under-21 international footballers
Isthmian League players
Bulgarian expatriate footballers
Bulgarian expatriate sportspeople in England
Expatriate footballers in England